Unmistakable: Love is the first extended play by American country music singer-songwriter Jo Dee Messina. The EP was released on April 27, 2010, through Curb Records. Unmistakable: Love is the first volume of a three-part extended play trilogy. The trilogy was initially planned to be full-length studio album, titled Unmistakable, and was scheduled for release on April 13, 2010. Unmistakable: Love includes seven newly recorded songs and two live acoustic recordings of Messina's previous singles, "Because You Love Me" and "Stand Beside Me". The next EPs, Drive and Inspiration, were released on November 9, 2010.

Track listing

Personnel
Brian Chris Autry- bass guitar
Mike Brignardello- bass guitar
Tom Bukovac- electric guitar
John Catchings- cello
Chad Cromwell- drums
Connie Ellisor- violin
Chris Farren- background vocals
Paul Franklin- steel guitar
Kenny Greenberg- electric guitar
Missi Hale- background vocals
Tania Hancheroff- background vocals
Tony Harrell- keyboards
Wes Hightower- background vocals
David Hofner- keyboards
Charlie Judge- keyboards
Jeff King- electric guitar
Troy Lancaster- electric guitar
Chris McHugh- drums
Rob McNelley- electric guitar, soloist
Jo Dee Messina- lead vocals
Steve Nathan- Hammond B-3 organ, piano, synthesizer
Russ Pahl- steel guitar
Brent Rader- keyboards, percussion
Michael Rhodes- bass guitar
Gordie Sampson- acoustic guitar, electric guitar, mandolin
Bryan Sutton- acoustic guitar
Robert Vaughn- acoustic guitar, background vocals
Biff Watson- acoustic guitar
Lonnie Wilson- drums
Paul Worley- electric guitar, soloist
Jonathan Yudkin- mandolin

Chart performance
The album debuted at No. 21 on the U.S. Billboard Top Country Albums chart and No. 106 on the U.S. Billboard 200, selling 5,048 copies in its first week.

References

External links
Jo Dee Messina, "Unmistakable Love" by Billboard

2010 debut EPs
Jo Dee Messina EPs
Curb Records EPs
Albums produced by Scott Hendricks